A national park is a reserve of land.

National park or national parks may also refer to:

Places

Parks and protected areas
List of national parks
National Park Service, manages all U.S. national parks

Municipalities
 National Park, New Jersey, a borough in Gloucester County, New Jersey
 National Park, New Zealand, a small town on the North Island Central Plateau in New Zealand, also known as National Park Village
 National Park, Tasmania, a locality

Arts, entertainment, and media

Groups
 National Park (band), a music group from Glasgow, Scotland
 The National Parks (band), American band

Films
 The National Parks: America's Best Idea (2009), a documentary by filmmaker Ken Burns

Other uses
 Nationals Park, the Washington Nationals' baseball field

See also
 Boundary Field, Washington, D.C. (alternative name for National Park, also known as American League Park II)
 Griffith Stadium, Washington, D.C. (former sports stadium built on the site of National Park)